Hotel Diablo is the fourth studio album by American musician Machine Gun Kelly. It was released on July 5, 2019, via Bad Boy Records and Interscope Records. The album was supported by four singles: "Hollywood Whore", "El Diablo", "I Think I'm Okay" with Yungblud and Travis Barker, and "Glass House" featuring Naomi Wild, with promotional single "Floor 13". The record is a rap rock album and followed less than 10 months after September 2018's Binge EP. The album's production also included Foster the People frontman Mark Foster.

It debuted at number five on the US Billboard 200. The album received generally positive reviews. Lyrically, the songs deal with problems with drugs, childhood family struggles, among other themes.

Background and promotion
Shortly after releasing the bonus tracks to Bloom (2017), Kelly announced he was going to start recording "album 4". In late 2018, Kelly announced he had a title for the upcoming album. After the release of his second EP, he responded to a fan, stating that "no songs from the EP will be on album 4". He also stated that he had erased all material on the album that was already there, and would start again from scratch. One of the deleted songs, was a collaboration between MGK and Lana Del Rey, which never came to fruition. On April 2, 2019, MGK posted a 16-second video snippet of a song along with the album title on social media. The video shows a girl in the bathtub with the album title looming above her. Kelly revealed that he would be going on tour soon for the Hotel Diablo World Tour to promote the upcoming album. On May 10, 2019, a 58-second video was posted, with Kelly rapping in preparation of the album. The song was rumored to be titled "Breaking News 2", a sequel to "Breaking News" from his 2013 mixtape Black Flag. By the first week of June 2019, three singles from the album had been released.

On June 11, 2019, Kelly announced the release date and shared a video of himself getting a head tattoo with the album name inked, with the caption reading "album comes JULY 5th". On June 27, Kelly revealed the album cover art.

Artwork and title
Kelly explained his personal thoughts in an interview with Beats 1 because of its nostalgic and dark feel, saying:

In an interview with ALT923Radio, Kelly revealed that the original name of the album was Delirium. He explained why this didn't come to fruition:

Singles
The first single was "Hollywood Whore", released on May 17, 2019. The music video, directed by Jordan Wozy, was released May 29, 2019. The song's lyrical content describes the music industry and how it can manipulate artists.

The second single, "El Diablo", was released on May 31, 2019. The music video, directed by Snuffy.NYC & Jimmy Regular, was released on July 25, 2019. The song is a mention of all the people who thought MGK's career was "falling down" due to the feud between MGK and Eminem. He also expresses his thoughts on the people who MGK thinks they "took credit and became famous".

The third single, "I Think I'm Okay", was released on June 7, 2019. Kelly released the song with Travis Barker and Yungblud. The music video, directed by Andrew Sandler, was released June 14, 2019.

The fourth single, "Glass House" was released on July 5, 2019. It features vocals from Naomi Wild. Its lyrical themes reveal mental struggles and drug problems, and being "all alone in a glass house".

Promotional singles
The song "Floor 13" was released on July 5, 2019. The song contains a cameo appearance from Kelly's daughter Casie at the end of the track.

Critical reception

Markos Papadatos of the Canadian internet news service Digital Journal praised the lyrics and overall album sound and mood. He wrote "Overall, Machine Gun Kelly has released a solid new album, Hotel Diablo. It showcases his maturity and growth as a singer-songwriter and musician." Papadatos concluded with "Most impressive about Machine Gun Kelly is that the same energy that he exudes on this album, he displays on stage in a live setting, which is incredible." He gave the album an A rating.

Jeremy Markus of The Cornell Daily Sun gave the album a positive review, while also stating the album is a powerful successor to 2018's Binge. He wrote, "Besides the improvement in writing, the album is simply much more enjoyable to listen to. Gone are the odd hooks and off-beat rapping from last year's project; they are replaced with intricate flows and a cohesive sound that spans across the entire production."

A negative review came from Dhruva Balram of NME, who said that "Despite the potency of its material, the project's lyricism feels apathetic. While his contemporaries, from Juice WLRD to Post Malone, are pushing the envelope, crafting new sounds and forging new paths, MGK sticks to a tried-and-tested formula which, ultimately, feels bland. At times, the album feels stagnated, as if it's stuck in a 2012 timewarp." He concluded that it was "a formulaic album that's been re-worked with the same puzzle pieces: clever wordplay, catchy beats and enough meat on its body to keep it alive. But it doesn't have enough of those facets to be in any way distinguished."

Commercial performance
Hotel Diablo debuted at number five on the Billboard 200, with 39,000 equivalent album units, 16,000 of that sum in album sales. It was his fourth top 10 album. It dropped to number 20 in its second week, selling 20,585 album equivalent units. In its third week on the chart, it dropped to number 38, selling 13,141 units.

Track listing

Charts

Weekly charts

Year-end charts

Certifications

References

External links

2019 albums
Machine Gun Kelly (musician) albums
Albums produced by Ronny J
Rap rock albums by American artists